Mohammadi (meaning related to Prophet Muhammad) is a common Afghan, Iranian and Sindhi surname. In Sindh, Mohammadi people reside in Pano Akil, Ghotki, Salehpat and Khanpur Mahar areas.

Notable people with the surname include:

Abbas Mohammadi, Iranian football goalkeeper
Ahmed Al-Muhammadi, Egyptian football player
Akbar Mohammadi (footballer) (born 1975), Iranian football player and coach
Akbar Mohammadi (student) (1972–2006), Iranian student pro-democracy protester who died in prison
Akram Mohammadi,  Iranian actress
Bismillah Khan Mohammadi, Afghan army general
Jum'a-Mohammad Mohammadi, Afghan politician
Kamin Mohammadi, exiled Iranian writer living in Britain
Manouchehr Mohammadi, Iranian film producer
Masoud Ali Mohammadi, Iranian physicist who was assassinated
Milad Mohammadi, Iranian footballer
Mohammad Nabi Mohammadi, Afghan politician
Mohammad Mohammadi Gilani, Iranian cleric and politician
Mohammad Mohammadi-Nik Reyshahri, Iranian cleric and politician
Morad Mohammadi, Iranian wrestler

Iranian-language surnames
Patronymic surnames
Surnames from given names